Beth Hall (born June 5, 1958) is an American actress best known for her portrayal of Wendy Harris on the CBS sitcom Mom. She also had a recurring role in Mad Men, and guest appearances on Murphy Brown, Frasier, House and Parks and Recreation. She grew up in Bogota, New Jersey and attended Rutgers University.

Filmography

References

External links

1958 births
Living people
American television actresses
20th-century American actresses
21st-century American actresses
People from Bogota, New Jersey
Rutgers University alumni
Jewish American actresses
Actresses from New Jersey
21st-century American Jews